Idiopterus nephrelepidis, commonly known as the black fern aphid, is a species of aphid insect that feeds on various species of fern. It is the type species of the genus Idiopterus.

Likely to have originated in the neotropics, it has spread right across Europe, though is only found indoors in Central and Northern Europe, New Zealand, and North America.

Notes

Macrosiphini
Insects described in 1909